The IFFI Award for Best Actor (officially known as the Silver Peacock for the Best Actor Award (Male)) is an honor presented annually at the International  Film Festival of India since 2010 to an actor for the best performance in a leading role in World cinema. Earlier the award was presented on two occasions at the 7th and 11th IFFI for two Indian actors.

List of award winners

References

Lists of Indian award winners
International Film Festival of India
Indian film festivals
Festivals in Goa
Indian film awards
Film awards for lead actor